Sir George Bonham, 2nd Baronet (28 August 1847 – 31 July 1927), was a British diplomat, ambassador to Serbia and Switzerland.

Career
George Francis Bonham was educated at Eton College and Exeter College, Oxford. He succeeded to the baronetcy at the age of 16 on the death of his father, the 1st baronet. He joined the Diplomatic Service in 1869 and served at the embassies in St Petersburg, Vienna, Rome, Lisbon, Madrid, Paris and The Hague. He was Secretary of the Embassy at Madrid 1893–1897 and at Rome 1897–1900. He was Minister to Serbia 1900–1903 and Minister to the Swiss Confederation 1905–1909.

References
BONHAM, Sir George (Francis), Who Was Who, A & C Black, 1920–2008; online edn, Oxford University Press, Dec 2007, accessed 28 May 2012

1847 births
1927 deaths
Baronets in the Baronetage of the United Kingdom
People educated at Eton College
Alumni of Exeter College, Oxford
Ambassadors of the United Kingdom to Serbia
Ambassadors of the United Kingdom to Switzerland